The 1903–04 Scottish Districts season is a record of all the rugby union matches for Scotland's district teams.

History

Edinburgh District beat Glasgow District in the Inter-City match.

Results

Inter-City

Glasgow District:

Edinburgh District:

Other Scottish matches

South of Scotland:

Anglo-Scots:

English matches

No other District matches played.

International matches

No touring matches this season.

References

1903–04 in Scottish rugby union
Scottish Districts seasons